Rasboroides is a genus of small cyprinid fishes endemic to Sri Lanka. They are found in small, slow-flowing and shaded streams in the southwestern part of the island. They are calm, social and attractively colored fish that sometimes are kept in aquariums.

Species 
Historically, there was only a single recognized species in this genus, R. vaterifloris, but in a review in 2013 four species were recognized, and this is followed by FishBase. A comprehensive review in 2018 disputed this and only recognized two species, R. pallidus and R. vaterifloris (the other two considered junior synonyms).

 Rasboroides nigromarginatus (Meinken, 1957)
 Rasboroides pallidus Deraniyagala, 1958
 Rasboroides rohani Batuwita, M. de Silva & Edirisinghe, 2013
 Rasboroides vaterifloris (Deraniyagala, 1930) (Pearly rasbora)

References 

 
Fish of Asia